Lead Me On is the second collaborative studio album by Conway Twitty and  Loretta Lynn. It was released on January 17, 1972, by Decca Records.

Critical reception

In the issue dated February 5, 1972, Billboard magazine published a review of the album, saying that "For their second package of duets, Twitty and Loretta Lynn come up with another dynamite selection of material certain to prove another hot chart item. Their hit single, "Lead Me On", is spotlighted and featured are standouts such as "Never Ending Song of Love", "Easy Loving", and the clever rhythm item, "You Blow My Mind", penned by Billy Edd Wheeler.

Cashbox published a review in the January 29, 1972 issue, which said, "Visually, Loretta Lynn and Conway Twitty are a stately and dignified couple. Their finely-cut features are emphasized by their subtle but modern and tasty choice of clothes. Although they look different and usually wear different color and style outfits, they are always coordinated – they are two different halves that combine as a whole which is more than either half. And so it is with their music; their finely-cut voices are adorned by subtle but modern arrangements and instrumentation. They both have different styles that merge into a new style that is both of them and something more. Listen to "Lead Me On", "You Blow My Mind", and "You're the Reason"."

The review published in the January 29, 1972 issue of Record World praised the music but criticized the album's artwork, saying it is a "Great bunch of tunes, but they sure ruined the cover photos with the blue border and the 100 white stars. The graphic people surely can't put a damper on the album's contents. The hot country duo hit hard with tunes like "Lead Me On", "Back Street Affair", and absolutely the most sexy version of "Easy Lovin'" ever recorded. A natural pick."

Commercial performance 
The album peaked at No. 2 on the US Billboard Hot Country LP's chart and No. 106 on the US Billboard Top LP's chart. The album was certified Gold by the RIAA for sales of more than 500,000 copies.

The album's only single, "Lead Me On", was released in September 1971 and peaked at No. 1 on the US Billboard Hot Country Singles chart, becoming the duo's second song to top the chart. In Canada, the single peaked at No. 1 on the RPM Country Singles chart.

Recording
Recording sessions for the album took place at Bradley's Barn in Mount Juliet, Tennessee, on November 21–23, 1971. "Lead Me On" was recorded on November 11, 1970, during the sessions for 1971's We Only Make Believe.

Track listing

Personnel
Adapted from the album liner notes and Decca recording session records.
Harold Bradley – bass guitar
Owen Bradley – producer
Ray Edenton – acoustic guitar
John Hughey – steel guitar
Darrell Johnson - mastering
The Jordanaires – background vocals
Loretta Lynn – lead vocals
Tommy Markham – drums
Bob Moore – bass
Hargus Robbins – piano
Jerry Smith – piano
Conway Twitty – lead vocals
Herman Wade – electric guitar

Charts 
Album

Singles

References 

1971 albums
Vocal duet albums
Conway Twitty albums
Loretta Lynn albums
Albums produced by Owen Bradley
Decca Records albums